= Memury =

- village
- Location in Kerala, India Memury (India)
- Coordinates: 9°43′20″N 76°29′0″E
- Country: India
- State: Kerala
- District: Ernakulam

Population (2011)
  - Total: 10,049

Languages
  - Official: Malayalam, English
- Time zone: UTC+5:30 (IST)

Memury is a village in Ernakulam district in the Indian state of Kerala.

== Demographics ==
As of 2011 India census, Memury had a population of 10049 with 5036 males and 5013 females.

== Notable people ==
Cyriac K. Pullapilly, a well-known theologian and historian, was raised in Memury. He later traveled to the United States, received his Ph.D. from the University of Chicago. He wrote over twenty historical books in English and in Malayalam.
